This is a list of ice hockey players who died during their playing careers.

Player deaths

Before 1931

1930–1969

1970–1989

1990–1999

2000–2009

2010–2019

2020–present day

See also
Sportspeople who died during their careers
Sudden cardiac death of athletes
List of ice hockey players who died in wars

References

External links
LostHockey.com

Death-related lists
Lists of ice hockey players
Deaths in sport